The men's 60 metres hurdles event  at the 1989 European Athletics Indoor Championships was held on 19 February.

Medalists

Results

Heats
First 2 from each heat (Q) and the next 6 fastest (q) qualified for the semifinals.

Semifinals
First 3 from each semifinal (Q) and the nest 2 fastest (q) qualified for the final.

Final

References

60 metres hurdles at the European Athletics Indoor Championships
60